Putnam Grounds can refer to two nineteenth century baseball stadiums.

Putnam Grounds in Brooklyn, New York were the home of the Brooklyn Putnams. It was also the site of the National Association of Base Ball Players championship in 1860, serving as neutral ground for the game between the Brooklyn Atlantics and the Brooklyn Excelsiors. The game was suspended during the fifth inning due to the unruly crowd.

Putnam Grounds in Troy, New York was home to the Troy Trojans baseball club from May 28, 1879 to September 20, 1879. It was located at Peoples Ave and 15th St.

References

Defunct baseball venues in the United States
Sports venues in Rensselaer County, New York
Sports venues in Brooklyn
Buildings and structures in Troy, New York
Baseball venues in New York City